is the fourth studio album by Japanese singer-songwriter Yosui Inoue, released in October 1974.

All tracks which appeared on the album were recorded at the studios in Los Angeles, owing to a record producer Hidenori Taga's suggestion. Except an arranger Katz Hoshi and a guitarist Hiromi Yasuda, recording for the album were completed by the Western session musicians. In addition to Hoshi who had participated in Inoue's previous albums, Gene Page joined the arrangement for some songs. The title track was arranged by Jack Nitzsche, who appointed all personnel and controlled the recording of the song rigidly.

Highly recommended by the recording artist himself, the song "Yūdachi" was released as a single prior to the album. It features an arrangement reminiscent of "Sympathy for the Devil" by The Rolling Stones. Because of the contribution for the song, an arranger Katz Hoshi won the 16th Japan Record Awards for "Best Arrangement" category.

Like a predecessor, Nishoku no Koma also reached the top on the Japanese Oricon Weekly LP charts, and remained there for ten consecutive weeks.

Track listing
All songs written and composed by Yōsui Inoue

Side one
All songs arranged by Katz Hoshi (except "Gomen", "Tsuki ga Warau" arranged by Gene Page, "Nishoku no Koma" arranged by Jack Nitzsche)
" (Introduction)" - 1:09
"" - 2:35
"" - 1:11
"Happy Birthday" - 3:56
"" - 3:05
"" - 2:59
"" - 3:43
"" - 5:18

Side two
All songs arranged by Katz Hoshi (except "London Kyūkou" and "Taiyou no Machi" arranged by Gene Page)
"" - 3:31
"" - 2:54
"" - 3:38
"" - 4:29
"" - 4:14
"" - 3:03

Personnel
Yosui Inoue - Vocals, guitar
Ray Parker Jr. - Guitar
David T. Walker - Guitar
Louie Shelton - Guitar
Jesse Ed Davis - Guitar
Hiromi Yasuda - Guitar
Dennis Budimir - Guitar
Orville Red Rhodes - Steel guitar
Edward Green - Drums
Harvey Mason - Drums
Wilton Felder - Bass guitar 
Max Bennett - Bass guitar
Scott Edwards - Bass guitar 
Reine Press - Bass guitar 
Larry Muhoberac - Keyboards
Joe Sample - Keyboards
Clarence McDonald - Keyboards
Peter Robinson - Keyboards
Jack Nitzsche - Keyboards
Joe Clayton - Percussion
Milt Holland - Percussion
Alan Estes - Percussion
Gary Coleman - Percussion

Production
Hidenori Taga - Produce
Yasuo Kawase -  Assistant
Katsuya Amuro -  Assistant
Yoshiyuki Okuda - Management
Henry Lewy - Engineer
Bruce Botnich - Engineer
Susumu Ohno - Engineer
Fuyuo Nakamura - Photography
Yosui Inoue - Photography
Fukuyo Inoue - Photography
Osamu Sakai - Layout design

Chart positions

Album

Singles

Awards

Release history

References

1974 albums
Yōsui Inoue albums